Home is the fourth studio album by Canadian artist Milosh, under his project Rhye. It was released on January 22, 2021, under Loma Vista Recordings.

Critical reception 

Home was generally well received by music critics, with the album holding a rating of 74 out of 100 on Metacritic, indicating "generally favorable reviews". According to Metacritic, Home was the 44th best rated album of 2021.

Reviewing the album for Pitchfork, Zach Schonfeld gave the album a positive review, stating: "Rhye leader Michael Milosh remains king of the most respectable horny music possible. His new album testifies to those talents without calling too much attention to itself." Jem Aswad of Variety summarised that "Home is bookended with a musical tactic that is both perfect and obvious [...] But as with everything Rhye, it's all in service of Milosh's crystalline voice."

Track listing

Charts

References

2021 albums
Loma Vista Recordings albums
Rhye albums